
Laguna Tejas is a lake in the Santa Cruz Department, Bolivia. Its surface area is 5.41 km².

Lakes of Santa Cruz Department (Bolivia)